More Gunfighter Ballads and Trail Songs is a studio album by country music singer Marty Robbins. It was released in 1960 by Columbia Records as a sequel to Robbins' 1959 hit album Gunfighter Ballads and Trail Songs.

In Billboard magazine's annual poll of country music disc jockeys, More Gunfighter Ballads was rated No. 9 among the "Favorite C&W Albums" of 1960.

AllMusic gave the album a rating of four-and-a-half stars. Reviewer Bruce Eder noted that "it is similar to the earlier album, with the sound a little more stripped down in the vocal department and perhaps less romanticized than the earlier record.."

Track listing
Side A
 "San Angelo" (Marty Robbins) – 5:41
 "Prairie Fire" (Joe Babcock) – 2:14
 "Streets of Laredo" – 2:47
 "Song of the Bandit" (Bob Nolan) – 2:30
 "I've Got No Use for the Women" – 3:21

Side B
 "Five Brothers" (Tompall Glaser) – 2:13
 "Little Joe the Wrangler" – 4:07
 "Ride, Cowboy Ride" (Lee Emerson) – 3:15
 "This Peaceful Sod" (Jim Glaser) – 1:54
 "She Was Young and She Was Pretty" (Marty Robbins) – 2:58
 "My Love" (Marty Robbins) – 1:45

Personnel
 Marty Robbins — lead vocals and guitar
 Grady Martin, Jack Pruett, Jim Glaser, Hank Garland — guitar
 Joseph Zinkan, Bob Moore — bass
 Floyd Cramer — piano
 Louis Dunn — drums
 Karl Garvin, Bill McElhiney — trumpet

References

1960 albums
Marty Robbins albums
Columbia Records albums